The 2011–12 season was Doncaster Rover's 9th consecutive season in The Football League, and their 4th consecutive in the second tier. This season resulted in relegation and ended their four-year stay in the Championship.

Season Review

Kits
Doncaster continued with Nike as their kit suppliers and One Call Insurance as their shirt sponsor. Their home kit contained Doncaster's traditional broad red and white hoops however this season they opted for black trimmings on their kit and the red shorts and socks replace last season black ones.

Events
 13 May – Doncaster reject a £2.3 million bid for Billy Sharp and a £300,000 bid for James Coppinger from Ipswich Town.
 1 July – Doncaster reject a £3.25 million bid for Billy Sharp from Southampton. Former Queens Park Rangers striker, Rowan Vine joins on a trial.
 5 September – Doncaster pay a total of £180,000 to Bury for the transfer of Kyle Bennet after a tribunal was settled, an initial £80,000 was to paid in two separate sums, one being immediately and another in January 2012 with a further £25,000 being paid for every 15 appearances he makes.
 20 September – Cardiff City's Jon Parkin holds talks over a possible one-month loan deal.
 23 September – Sean O'Driscoll is placed on gardening leave after 1 draw and 6 losses. Former Wrexham boss Dean Saunders joins on a three-year deal.
 27 October – Former Wales international John Oster is ruled out for two months to undergo neck surgery.
 31 October – Senegalese striker El-Hadji Diouf signs a 3-month deal which is later extended to the end of the 2012/13 season.
 23 November – Midfielder Bolo Zenden opens talks with Doncaster over a potential free transfer.

Championship

Standings

Results summary

Result round by round

FA Cup

League Cup

Squad

Detailed Overview

Statistics

|-
|colspan="14"|Players played for Doncaster Rovers this season but who have left the club:

|}

Goalscorers

Disciplinary record

Penalties

Suspensions Serves

Long-Term Injuries

Contracts

Notes1With the option of a second year.

Transfers

In

Notes
1Although officially undisclosed the fee was reported to be £200,000.

Loans In

Notes 1Kirkland originally signed on a three-month deal till January, but was sent back after a back injury on the date stated.
2Fortuné originally signed until 2 January, but was recalled due to injury problems at West Bromwich Albion.

Out

Loans Outs

Fixtures & Results

Pre-season

Championship

FA Cup

League Cup

Overall Summary

Summary

Competition Summary

References

2011-12
2011–12 Football League Championship by team